Curraheen, County Tipperary, can refer to 
Curraheen, Carrick on Suir, County Tipperary 
Curraheen, Cashel, County Tipperary 
Curraheen, Clogheen, County Tipperary 
Curraheen, Aghnameadle, Nenagh, County Tipperary 
Curraheen, Killoscully, Nenagh, County Tipperary 
Curraheen, Lisbunny, Nenagh, County Tipperary 
Curraheen, Thurles, County Tipperary 
Curraheen, Tipperary town, County Tipperary